Thandawgan is one of the 37 nats in the official pantheon of Burmese nats. The nat is a representation of historical Yè Thiha, a royal messenger of Minkhaung, the viceroy of Taungoo and brother of King Bayinnaung. According to the belief, Ye Thiha went to the forest to gather flowers, contracted malaria, and died. He is portrayed sitting on a lotus pedestal holding a fan in his right hand and his left hand resting on his knee.

References

08
Deaths from malaria